The Marcum-Moss Head Coach of the Year is presented annually by various news and sports organizations to the AFL head coach who has done the most outstanding job of working with the talent he has at his disposal.

AFL Coach of the Year

Clint Dolezel and Kevin Guy were co-winners of the award in 2016

References

External links
AFL Coach of the Year

Arena Football League trophies and awards